Gwyn Evans may refer to:
 Gwyn Evans (rugby union), Welsh rugby union player
 Gwyn Evans (footballer), Welsh footballer
 Gwyn Evans (bowls), lawn bowler

See also
Gwynn Evans, cricketer
Gwyneth Evans (disambiguation)